Commewijne may refer to:
 Commewijne District
 Commewijne River